Magyarszecsőd is a village in Vas county, Hungary.

Sightseeing
Magyarszecsőd and Molnaszecsőd are sister villages. The older church, from the Árpád age, can be found in Magyarszecsőd. The beautiful southern doorway emphasizes the artistic view of the southern facade, while wall columns (pilasters) decorate all the walls around. It has a west tower, as at several Árpád age churches in Hungary.

References

Populated places in Vas County
Romanesque architecture in Hungary